John Curry  (b. in Dublin, Ireland, in the first quarter of the eighteenth century; d. there, 1780) was an Irish doctor of medicine, historian, and Roman Catholic activist.

Life

He studied medicine at Paris and Reims and returned to Dublin to practise his profession. Curry took part in the campaign of the Irish Catholics for the repeal of penal laws, and was one of the founders, with Charles O'Conor, of the Catholic Committee which met in Essex Street, 1760.

Works

He published in London, in 1747, a Brief Account from the most authentic Protestant writers of the Irish Rebellion, 1641, against partisan anti-Catholic history. This book was bitterly attacked by Walter Harris in a 1752 volume published in Dublin, and in reply Curry published his Historical Memoirs, afterwards enlarged and published in 1775 under the title An Historical and Critical Review of the Civil Wars in Ireland. This is his major work; a new edition of it, enlarged from Curry's manuscript, was published by Charles O'Conor in two volumes (Dublin, 1786) and again in one volume (Dublin, 1810). 

In this work, after a brief glance over the developments in Ireland after the invasion of Henry II of England, he takes up the history at the reign of Elizabeth I of England and carries it down to the Settlement under William III of England.

Besides these, he published An Essay on Ordinary Fevers (London, 1743) and Some Thoughts on the Nature of Fevers (London, 1774).

Further reading
 Observations on the popery laws (1771)
 An historical and critical review of the civil wars in Ireland, from the reign of Queen Elizabeth, to the settlement under King William, (1810)

References

Attribution

1780 deaths
Medical doctors from Dublin (city)
18th-century Irish historians
Year of birth unknown
18th-century Irish writers
18th-century Irish male writers
18th-century Irish medical doctors